The 688 Club was a popular alternative music venue in Atlanta, Georgia, located at 688 Spring Street, near the intersection of Spring and 3rd Streets. The 688 Club opened in May 1980 and closed in November 1986. The club was operated by Steve May. The club was co-owned by Tony Evans, John Wicker, and in its final years by Mike Hendry. Cathy Hendrix served as the club's music director. During its brief lifetime, the 688 played host to hundreds of punk rock, new wave and alternative rock bands, many of whom would later become well known.

During the early 1980s, the 688 Club was the primary place for up-and-coming bands from Atlanta and Athens, Georgia, to get noticed. Among the groups that regularly played there were R.E.M. and Pylon. The club spun off an independent record label, 688 Records, which survived for a time even after 688 Club had closed. Dash Rip Rock's self-titled debut LP was the first album released by 688 Records.

After 688 Club
The club re-opened as the "686 Club" on December 31, 1986, but was renamed "The Rollick" the next day. By 1990, the space was occupied by a club called "Weekends". The club was operated by an Atlanta attorney as an industrial/goth club known as Tyranny from 1995 - 2000.  The space was later occupied by Outa Control Inc. Sometime thereafter, the original building was extensively remodeled, and  houses a Concentra urgent care medical facility.

List of performers 

A partial list of notable bands and artists that appeared at the 688 Club between 1980 and 1986:

 10,000 Maniacs
 999
 8 Eyed Spy (Lydia Lunch)
 The Accelerators
 Alex Chilton
 The Bangles
 The Basics
 Billy Idol
 The Black Crowes (as "Mr. Crowe's Garden")
 Black Flag
 Bo Diddley
 The BoDeans
 The Bongos
 The Brains
 Glenn Branca
 Bush Tetras
 Butthole Surfers
 Cabaret Voltaire
 Certain General
 Chris Wood & The New Restraints
 Chubby Checker
 The Church
 Circle Jerks
 The Creatures
 The Cretones
 Dash Rip Rock
 DDT
 Dead Kennedys
 D.N.A.
 Dreams So Real
 Dream Syndicate
 Drivin' N' Cryin'
 Echo & the Bunnymen
 Einstürzende Neubauten
 The Exploited
 The Fall
 Fishbone
 The Fleshtones
 Flipper
 A Flock of Seagulls
 Gang of Four
 The Go-Go's
 The Golden Palominos
 Guadalcanal Diary
 The Gun Club
 Hoodoo Gurus
 Human Sexual Response
 Hüsker Dü
 Iggy Pop
 INXS
 Jason & the Scorchers
 The Jesus and Mary Chain
 Jim Carroll
 Joe "King" Carrasco
 John Cale
 Johnny Clegg and Savuka
 Jonathan Richman
 Kevin McFoy Dunn
 Let's Active
 Love Tractor
 Lyres
 Marianne Faithfull
 Marshall Crenshaw
 Meat Puppets
 The Method Actors
 Minutemen
 Mr. Crowe's Garden
 New Order
 The Nightporters

 Now Explosion
 Oh OK
 Oingo Boingo
 Pete Shelley
 Peter Tork
 The Plague
 The Plastics
 The Plazza Drugs
 The Psychedelic Furs
 Public Image Ltd.
 Pylon
 Ramones
 Raves
 Raybeats
 Red Hot Chili Peppers
 R.E.M.
 The Replacements
 The Residents
 The Restraints
 Richard Hell and the Voidoids
 Robyn Hitchcock
 Rodney Crowell
 RuPaul
 Saccharine Trust
 Samhain
 The Side Effects
 Siouxsie and the Banshees
 The Smithereens
 Sonic Youth
 Specimen
 Stan Ridgway
 The Stranglers
 The Swimming Pool Q's
 The Swinging Richards
 Timbuk 3
 Translator
 Uncle Green
 The Vapors
 Vietnam
 Violent Femmes
 Voodoo Idols
 Wall of Voodoo
 Wee Wee Pole
 XTC
 X-teens

References

External links 
 

Music venues in Atlanta
Former music venues in the United States
1980 establishments in Georgia (U.S. state)
1986 disestablishments in the United States